The Road to Damascus may refer to:
 Conversion of Paul the Apostle, an event in the Christian Bible
 "The Road To Damascus", an episode of Carnivàle
 To Damascus, a trilogy of plays by the Swedish playwright August Strindberg
 The Road to Damascus (film), a 1952 French adventure film durected by